Kings Meadows High School is a government co-educational comprehensive secondary school located in , a southern suburb of , Tasmania, Australia. Established in 1960, the school caters for approximately 550 students from Years 7 to 12. The school is administered by the Tasmanian Department of Education.

In 2019 student enrolments were 540. The school principal is Cary Stocks.

The school services the Kings Meadows, Youngtown, and Northern Midlands area.

See also 
 List of schools in Tasmania
 Education in Tasmania

References

External links
 Kings Meadows High School

Public high schools in Tasmania
Schools in Launceston, Tasmania
Rock Eisteddfod Challenge participants
Educational institutions established in 1960
1960 establishments in Australia